The Instituto Meteorológico Nacional (IMN) is the national meteorological agency of Costa Rica.

References

External links

Science and technology in Costa Rica
Meteorologico
Hydrology organizations
Government of Costa Rica
Governmental meteorological agencies in North America